Bahaedin Adab, also spelled Bahaeddin or Bahaoddin Adab, Kurdish "Baha Adab" (21 August 1945 – 16 August 2007) was a prominent Iranian Kurdish politician and engineer and philanthropist. He was born in Sanandaj and had a civil engineering master's degree from Amirkabir University of Technology (Tehran Polytechnique). He died of cancer on 16 August 2007 in Tehran. He was buried in "Bahasht Mhamadi" Behesht-e Mohammadi cemetery in Sanandaj alongside his parents.

He had been elected as a member of the Iranian Parliament (Majlis of Iran) for two consecutive terms (1996–2004) from Sanandaj, Kamyaran and Diwandarreh. However, he was disqualified by the Guardian Council for the 7th parliament elections, as were many other independent or reformist candidates, because of his open criticism of the system. After he was barred from the elections, with some other individuals he founded the new political movement Kurdish United Front in early 2006.

Adab served as the chairman of the Syndicate of Iranian Construction Contractors, CEO of Abej Construction Company, CEO of Ravagh Construction Company, deputy chairman of the Confederation of Iranian Industries, member of the Board of Directors of Chamber of Commerce and Industry, deputy chairman of Karafarin Bank, member of the Board of Karafarin Insurance, chairman of the Association of Engineering and Building Controllers, chairman of Namavaran Mohandessi Investment Company, member of the Board of Trustees of Amirkabir University of Technology (Polytechnique), and deputy chairman of the Iranian Basketball Federation.

References

Deaths from cancer in Iran
Iranian civil engineers
Iranian Kurdish politicians
Kurdish United Front politicians
People from Sanandaj
1945 births
2007 deaths
Islamic Iran Participation Front politicians
Members of the 5th Islamic Consultative Assembly
Members of the 6th Islamic Consultative Assembly